James Kevin Mack (born August 9, 1962) is an American former professional football player who was a fullback in the National Football League (NFL).

Early life
Mack was born in Kings Mountain, North Carolina. He began playing football as a youth in Pop Warner football games, but he was more focused as a teenager in track competitions. He was a star athlete at Kings Mountain High School.

Mack attended Clemson University for four years where he played football for its team, helping them reach the national championship in 1981. He averaged over five yards per carry his senior year at Clemson, running 886 yards and scoring 8 touchdowns.

Professional athletic career
Mack was selected by the Washington Federals in the 1984 USFL Territorial Draft. He was traded to the Los Angeles Express, where he played the 1984 USFL season.

He was also selected by the Cleveland Browns 11th overall in the 1984 NFL Supplemental Draft of USFL and CFL Players. He joined the Browns to play the 1985 NFL season. As a rookie, he rushed for 1,104 yards and 7 touchdowns and was the AFC Rookie of the year.

Mack played for the Browns for nine seasons, from 1985 to 1993. In 1985, Mack rushed for 1,104 yards and halfback Earnest Byner rushed for 1,001 yards, becoming just the third pair of teammates to run for over 1,000 yards for the same team in the same season. Nicknamed "Mack Truck", he was a two-time Pro Bowl selection in 1985 and 1987.

After athletic career
After playing in the NFL, Mack relocated to Houston, Texas, where among other work he was a coach, including at Texas Southern University.

Since returning to Cleveland, Ohio, Mack has worked for the Cleveland Browns in its Alumni Relations Department. He had originally expected to become a talent scout for the team, initially being named the team's Assistant Director of Player Programs when coming back to the organization in 2007.

Awards and recognition
 1981: Honorable Mention All-American
 1981: MVP, Blue-Gray All-Star Game
 1985: AFC Rookie of the Year 
 2000: Kings Mountain's Football Player of the 20th Century (designated by Kings Mountain Herald)
 2012: 58th Greatest football player in the history of the NFL's Cleveland Browns (designated by Cleveland.com)
 2012: Kings Mountain's Player of the Decade of the 1970s
 2016: Dino Lucarelli Lifetime Achievement Award (National Football Foundation and Cleveland Touchdown Club Charities) 
 2016: Greater Cleveland Sports Hall of Fame
 2017: Cleveland County Sports Hall of Fame

Personal life
Mack has mentioned having two daughters who were young when he resided in Houston; he lived there for about 14 years.

In 1989 in Cuyahoga County Court in Cleveland, Mack pleaded guilty to cocaine use in exchange for three other charges (cocaine trafficking, possession of criminal tools, and using a motor vehicle for drug abuse) being dropped. He was sentenced to six months in jail.

References

External links
 

1962 births
Living people
People from Kings Mountain, North Carolina
Players of American football from North Carolina
American Conference Pro Bowl players
American football running backs
Clemson Tigers football players
Cleveland Browns players
Los Angeles Express players
Prisoners and detainees of Ohio